Acompsia pyrenaella is a moth of the family Gelechiidae. It is found in the Pyrenees.

The forewings of the males are brown with groups of black scales. The hindwings are light grey. Females dark grey-brown forewings, mottled with light grey and with yellow and black scales. The hindwings are grey. Adults have been recorded on wing from early July to early August.

References

Moths described in 2002
Acompsia
Moths of Europe